Sathiyamangalam is a village in the Gingee Taluk of Villupuram district, Tamil Nadu, India. Sathiyamangalam is located at a distance of 12 km from Gingee, its nearest town. Sri kaliamman Alayam is most popular one. The Sakthi Kaliamman Temple is a Hindu temple dedicated to the goddess Kaliamma located in the village of Sathiyamangalam in the Gingee taluk of Villupuram District, India. The Pongal festival and the annual Vigasi festivals are important festivals celebrated.

History

This temple was athi sakthi birthplace so that only the village name is Sathiyamangalam. Sathiyamangalam have many stories.

Deities

The prime deity is Kaliamman. The temple is open to devotees only thrice a week – Thursday, Friday and Sunday. [1] It is believed that the main deity, all day kaliamman stay there.

Festivals

A Pongal festival is held annually during the month of January. During the festival, the idol of goddess Kaliamman is brought from the temple one day thiru veethi ula. The pongal-festival is a part of the annual festival that is celebrated for a period of 3 days.
A yearly once Annual festival has been performed during every year" Vaikasi" around 22nd date Tamil month.

Demographics 

As per the 2001 census, Sathiyamangalam had a total population of 3355. with 1678 males and 1677 females. Out of the total population 1903    people were literate.

References

Villages in Viluppuram district